Batman Forever (on-screen title is simply Forever) is a 1995 American superhero film directed by Joel Schumacher and produced by Tim Burton, based on the DC Comics character Batman by Bob Kane and Bill Finger. The third installment of Warner Bros.' initial Batman film series, it is a stand-alone sequel to Batman Returns starring Val Kilmer, replacing Michael Keaton as Bruce Wayne / Batman, alongside Tommy Lee Jones, Jim Carrey, Nicole Kidman, and Chris O'Donnell, while Michael Gough, and Pat Hingle reprise their roles. The plot focuses on Batman trying to stop Two-Face and the Riddler in their scheme to extract information from all the minds in Gotham City while adopting an orphaned acrobat named Dick Grayson—who becomes his sidekick, Robin—and developing feelings for psychologist Dr. Chase Meridian.

Schumacher mostly eschewed the dark, dystopian atmosphere of Burton's films by drawing inspiration from the Batman comic books of the Dick Sprang era, as well as the 1960s television series. After Keaton chose not to reprise his role, William Baldwin and Ethan Hawke were considered as a replacement before Val Kilmer joined the cast.

Batman Forever was released on June 16, 1995, to mixed reviews from critics, who praised the performances (particularly Kilmer, Jones, and Carrey), visuals, action sequences, and soundtrack, but criticized the costume designs and tonal departure from previous films. The film was a box office success, grossing over $336 million worldwide and becoming the sixth-highest-grossing film worldwide of 1995. It was followed by Batman & Robin in 1997, with Schumacher returning as the director, Chris O'Donnell returning as Robin, and George Clooney replacing Kilmer as Batman.

Plot

In Gotham City, local vigilante/superhero Batman defuses a hostage situation orchestrated by a criminal known as Two-Face, formerly district attorney Harvey Dent. Flashbacks reveal that Two-Face was disfigured with acid by mobster Sal Maroni, which Batman failed to prevent, causing Dent to develop a split personality. Edward Nygma, an eccentric researcher at Wayne Enterprises, approaches his employer, Bruce Wayne (Batman's civilian identity), with an invention that can beam television signals directly into a person's brain. Bruce rejects the device, concerned the technology could manipulate minds. After killing his supervisor and staging it as a suicide, Nygma resigns and plots revenge against Bruce, sending him riddles. Criminal psychologist Dr. Chase Meridian diagnoses Nygma as psychotic.

Bruce attends a Haly's Circus event with Chase. Two-Face hijacks the event and threatens to detonate a bomb unless Batman surrenders. Acrobat Dick Grayson, the youngest member of the Flying Graysons, manages to throw the bomb into the river, but Two-Face kills his family. Bruce persuades the orphaned Dick to live at Wayne Manor as his ward, and Dick discovers Bruce is Batman. Determined to avenge his family, Dick demands to join Batman in crime-fighting, hoping to kill Two-Face, but Bruce refuses.

Nygma, inspired by Two-Face, adopts a criminal persona, the Riddler, and allies with Two-Face. They commit a series of robberies to finance Nygma's new company and mass-produce his brainwave device, the "Box", which steals information from users' minds and transfers it to Nygma's, which makes him smarter in the process. At a party hosted by Nygma, Batman pursues Two-Face and is almost killed but is saved by Dick.

Batman visits Chase, who explains that she has fallen in love with Bruce. He reveals to her his secret identity. The Riddler and Two-Face, having discovered Bruce's secret through the Box, blow up the Batcave, shooting Bruce and kidnapping Chase. As Bruce recovers, he and his butler, Alfred, deduce that Nygma is the Riddler. Bruce finally accepts Dick as Batman's partner, Robin.

At the Riddler's lair, Robin almost kills Two-Face, who holds him at gunpoint, but spares him. The Riddler reveals that Chase and Robin are bound and gagged in tubes above a deadly drop, giving Batman the chance to save only one. Batman distracts the Riddler with a riddle, before destroying the Riddler's brainwave receiver with a Batarang, draining the Riddler's mind, and allowing Batman to rescue both. Two-Face corners them and determines their fate by flipping a coin, but Batman throws a handful of identical coins in the air, causing Two-Face to stumble in confusion and fall to his death.

Committed to Arkham Asylum, Nygma now exclaims that he is Batman, flapping the arms of his straitjacket, now completely delusional. Bruce resumes his crusade as Batman, with Robin as his partner.

Cast
 Val Kilmer as Bruce Wayne / Batman: After coming across the journal of his father, Wayne starts questioning his act of vengeance. He struggles with his dual identity as a crime fighter, becoming romantically involved with Dr. Chase Meridian.
 Tommy Lee Jones as Harvey Dent / Two-Face: Formerly the good district attorney of Gotham City. Half of Harvey's face is scarred and his brain is also damaged with acid during the conviction of a crime boss. Driven insane, he becomes the criminal Two-Face.
 Jim Carrey as Edward Nygma / The Riddler: A former Wayne Enterprises employee, Edward resigns after his newest invention is personally rejected by Bruce Wayne. He becomes the villainous Riddler, leaving riddles and puzzles at scenes of crime.
 Nicole Kidman as Dr. Chase Meridian: A psychologist and love interest of Bruce Wayne. Chase is fascinated by the dual nature of Batman. She's held as a damsel in distress in the climax.
 Chris O'Donnell as Dick Grayson/Robin: Once a circus acrobat, Dick is taken in by Bruce after Two-Face murders his parents and brother at a circus event. Bruce is reminded when his parents were murdered when he sees the same vengeance in Dick, and decides to take him in as his ward. He eventually discovers the Batcave and learns Bruce's secret identity. In his wake, he becomes the crime fighting partner, Robin.
 Michael Gough as Alfred Pennyworth: The Wayne family's faithful butler and Bruce's confidant. Alfred also befriends the young Dick Grayson.
 Pat Hingle as James Gordon: The police commissioner of Gotham City.
 George Wallace as The Mayor: The mayor of Gotham City.
 Drew Barrymore as Sugar: Two-Face's "good" angelic-like assistant. Has short curly blonde hair. She wears a white corset bodysuit with stockings and a fluffy white robe overneath. She shows more of a sweet attitude and tone than a sinister one.
 Debi Mazar as Spice: Two-Face's "bad" gothic-like assistant/girlfriend. She is clad in a black leather corset with fishnet stockings on her legs with shiny black latex heels and long black leather gloves and appears as of a dominatrix. She wears most of her brunette hair up with red highlights. She speaks in a seductive malevolent tone. Spice has a twisted sense of humor and vile nature.
 Ed Begley Jr. as Fred Stickley: Edward Nygma's ill-tempered supervisor at Wayne Enterprises. After Stickley discovers the true nature of Nygma's invention, Nygma kills him and makes it look like suicide. Begley was uncredited for this role.
 Ofer Samra as Harvey's Thug
 Elizabeth Sanders as Gossip Gerty: Gotham's top gossip columnist.
 René Auberjonois as Dr. Burton: Head Doctor of Arkham Asylum.
 Larry A. Lee as John Grayson: Dick Grayson's father and leader of the Flying Graysons
 Glory Fioramonti as Mary Grayson: Dick Grayson's mother
 En Vogue as girls on the corner who are hoping to see Batman.
 Joe Grifasi as Hawkins: A bank guard and Two-Face's hostage during the opening scene.
 Michael Paul Chan as Assistant #1
 Jon Favreau as Assistant #2

Additionally, President pro tempore of the United States Senate and self-admitted Batman fan Patrick Leahy makes an uncredited appearance as himself.

Production

Development

Batman Returns was released in 1992 with financial success and generally favorable reviews from critics, but Warner Bros. was disappointed with its box office run, having made $150 million less than the first film. After Batman Returns was deemed too dark and inappropriate for children, with McDonald's even recalling their Happy Meal tie-in, Warner Bros. decided that this was the primary cause of the film's financial results and asked Burton to step down as director; while Sam Raimi (who would later go on to direct Spider-Man in 2002) and John McTiernan were considered, Joel Schumacher was selected by Warner Bros. after his work in The Client and approval from Burton. Husband-and-wife screenwriting duo Lee and Janet Scott-Batchler were brought on to write the script. Warner Bros. had lost a bidding war for their spec script for an earlier project titled Smoke and Mirrors to Disney's Hollywood Pictures. The project ultimately fell through, and Warner Bros. offered the Batchlers several of their film properties to script write. Being familiar with comic books from their childhood, the Batchlers chose to work on the next Batman film, which would become Batman Forever. In a meeting with Burton, they agreed that "the key element to Batman is his duality. And it's not just that Batman is Bruce Wayne."

Their original script introduced a psychotic Riddler, real name Lyle Heckendorf, with a pet rat accompanying him. A scene cut from the final film included Heckendorf obtaining his costume from a fortune-telling leprechaun at the circus. Instead of NygmaTech, the company would have been named HeckTech. The story elements and much of the dialogue still remained in the finished film, though Schumacher felt it could be "lighte[ne]d down". Keaton initially approved the selection of Schumacher as director and planned on reprising his role as Batman from the first two films. Schumacher claims he originally had in mind an adaptation of Frank Miller's Batman: Year One and Keaton claimed that he was enthusiastic about the idea. Warner Bros. rejected the idea as they wanted a sequel, not a prequel, though Schumacher was able to include very brief events in Bruce Wayne's childhood with some events of the comic The Dark Knight Returns. Akiva Goldsman, who worked with Schumacher on The Client, was brought in to rewrite the script, deleting the initial idea of bringing in the Scarecrow as a villain with Riddler, and the return of Catwoman. Burton, who now was more interested in directing Ed Wood, later reflected he was taken aback by some of the focus group meetings for Batman Forever, a title he hated. Producer Peter MacGregor-Scott represented the studio's aim in making a film for the MTV Generation with full merchandising appeal.

Casting 
Production went on fast track with Rene Russo cast as Chase Meridian but Keaton decided not to reprise Batman because he did not like the direction the series was headed in and rejected the script. Keaton also wanted to pursue "more interesting roles", turning down $15 million. A decision was made to go with a younger actor for Bruce Wayne, and an offer was made to Ethan Hawke, who turned it down but eventually regretted the decision; he would eventually voice the character in the preschool animated series Batwheels. Schumacher had seen Val Kilmer in Tombstone, but was also interested in Keanu Reeves (who would later voice Bruce Wayne / Batman in DC: League of Super-Pets in 2022), Alec and William Baldwin, Dean Cain, Tom Hanks, Kurt Russell, Ralph Fiennes (who would later voice Alfred Pennyworth in The Lego Batman Movie in 2017), Daniel Day-Lewis and Johnny Depp. Cain was scrapped as he was well known for starring in the TV series Lois & Clark: The New Adventures of Superman. Burton pushed Depp to get the role. Kilmer, who as a child visited the studios where the 1960s series was recorded and shortly before had visited a bat cave in Africa, was contacted by his agent for the role. Kilmer signed on without reading the script or knowing who the director was.

With Kilmer's casting, Warner Bros. dropped Russo, considering her too old to be paired with Kilmer. Sandra Bullock, Robin Wright, Jeanne Tripplehorn and Linda Hamilton were all considered for the role, which was eventually recast with Nicole Kidman. Billy Dee Williams took the role of Harvey Dent in Batman on the possibility of portraying Two-Face in a sequel, but Schumacher cast Tommy Lee Jones in the role, although Al Pacino, Clint Eastwood, Martin Sheen and Robert De Niro were considered, after working with him on The Client. Jones was reluctant to accept the role, but did so at his son's insistence.

Robin Williams was in discussions to be the Riddler at one point, and was reportedly in competition for the role with John Malkovich. In June 1994, the role was given to Jim Carrey after Williams had reportedly turned it down. In a 2003 interview, Schumacher stated Michael Jackson had lobbied hard for the role, but was turned down before Carrey was cast. Brad Dourif (who was Burton's original choice to portray the Joker and Scarecrow after), Kelsey Grammer, Micky Dolenz, Matthew Broderick, Phil Hartman, Steve Martin, Adam Sandler and Rob Schneider were also considered.

Robin had appeared in the shooting script for Batman Returns but was deleted due to having too many characters. Marlon Wayans had been cast in the role and signed on for a potential sequel, but when Schumacher took over, he decided to open up casting to other actors. Leonardo DiCaprio was considered, but decided not to pursue the role after a meeting with Schumacher. Matt Damon, Corey Haim, Corey Feldman, Mark Wahlberg, Michael Worth, Danny Dyer, Toby Stephens, Ewan McGregor, Jude Law, Alan Cumming, Christian Bale (who would later star as Batman/Bruce Wayne in The Dark Knight trilogy), and Scott Speedman were considered also. Chris O'Donnell was cast and Mitch Gaylord served as his stunt double, and also portrayed Mitch Grayson, Dick's older brother, created for the film. Schumacher attempted to create a cameo role for Bono as his MacPhisto character, but both came to agree it was not suitable for the film.

Filming
Principal photography began on September 24, 1994, and wrapped on March 5, 1995. Schumacher hired Barbara Ling for production design, claiming that the film needed a "force" and good design. Ling could "advance on it". Schumacher wanted a design in no way connected to the previous films, and instead inspired by the images from the Batman comic books seen in the 1940s/early 1950s and New York City architecture in the 1930s, with a combination of modern Tokyo. He also wanted a "city with personality," with more statues, as well as various amounts of neon.

Difficulties and Clashes
Schumacher and Kilmer clashed while they were making Forever; Schumacher described Kilmer as "childish and impossible," reporting that he fought with various crewmen, and refused to speak to Schumacher for two weeks after the director told him to stop being rude. Schumacher also mentioned Tommy Lee Jones as a source of trouble: "Jim Carrey was a gentleman, and Tommy Lee was threatened by him. I'm tired of defending overpaid, overprivileged actors. I pray I don't work with them again." Carrey later acknowledged Jones was not friendly to him, telling him once off-set during the production, "I hate you. I really don't like you ... I cannot sanction your buffoonery."

Design and effects
Rick Baker designed the prosthetic makeup. John Dykstra, Andrew Adamson, and Jim Rygiel served as visual effects supervisors, with Pacific Data Images also contributing to visual effects work. PDI provided a computer-generated Batman for complicated stunts. For the costume design, producer Peter MacGregor-Scott claimed that 146 workers were at one point working together. Batman's costume was redesigned along the lines of a more "MTV organic, and edgier feel" to the suit. Sound editing and mixing was supervised by Bruce Stambler and John Levesque, which included trips to caves to record bat sounds. A new Batmobile was designed for Batman Forever, with two cars being constructed, one for stunt purposes and one for close-ups. Swiss surrealist painter H. R. Giger provided his version for the Batmobile but it was considered too sinister for the film. Nygma's brainwave device bears a striking resemblance to the project of Christopher Columbus memorial, designed by Russian avant-garde architect Konstantin Melnikov in 1929.

The film used some motion capture for certain special effects. Warner Bros had acquired motion capture technology from arcade video game company Acclaim Entertainment for use in the film's production.

Music

Elliot Goldenthal was hired by Schumacher to compose the film score before the screenplay was written. In discussions with Schumacher, the director wanted Goldenthal to avoid taking inspiration from Danny Elfman, and requested an original composition. The film's promotional teaser trailer however used the main title theme from Elfman's score of 1989's Batman.

The soundtrack was commercially successful, selling almost as many copies as Prince's soundtrack to the 1989 Batman film. Only five of the songs on the soundtrack are actually featured in the movie. Hit singles from the soundtrack include "Hold Me, Thrill Me, Kiss Me, Kill Me" by U2 and "Kiss from a Rose" by Seal, both of which were nominated for MTV Movie Awards. "Kiss from a Rose" (whose music video was also directed by Joel Schumacher) reached No. 1 in the U.S. charts as well. The soundtrack itself, featuring additional songs by The Flaming Lips, Brandy (both songs also included in the film), Method Man, Nick Cave, Michael Hutchence (of INXS), PJ Harvey, and Massive Attack, was an attempt to (in producer Peter MacGregor-Scott's words) make the film more "pop".

Release

Marketing

In addition to a large line of toys, video games and action figures from Kenner, the McDonald's food chain released several collectibles and mugs to coincide with the release of the film. Peter David and Alan Grant wrote separate novelizations of the film. Dennis O'Neil authored a comic book adaptation, with art by Michal Dutkiewicz.

Six Flags Great Adventure theme park re-themed their "Axis Chemical" arena, home of the Batman stunt show, to resemble "Batman Forever", and the new show featured props from the film. Six Flags Over Texas featured a one-time fireworks show to promote the movie, and replica busts of Batman, Robin, Two-Face, and the Riddler can still be found in the Justice League store in the Looney Tunes U.S.A. section. Batman: The Ride opened at Six Flags St. Louis to promote the movie. At Six Flags Over Georgia, The Mind Bender roller coaster was redesigned to look as though it were the creation of The Riddler and some images and props were used in the design of the roller coaster and its queue.

Puerto Rican company Kiddie's Manufacturing released a coin-operated kiddie ride based on the Batmobile from the film in 1995. It is still a popular kiddie ride to this day, being found at many shopping malls and arcades throughout North America and the United Kingdom.

Video games
Video games based on the film were released. A video game of the same name, was released in 1995 for Super Nintendo Entertainment System, Game Boy, Sega Genesis, Game Gear, R-Zone and MS-DOS, it was followed by Batman & Robin for the PlayStation, to promote the release of the film. Two arcade versions, Batman Forever: The Arcade Game, was released in 1996 and was ported to the three consoles, and themed-pinball machine was released in 1995 by Sega Pinball.

Home media 
Batman Forever was released on VHS and LaserDisc on October 31, 1995. Over 3 million VHS copies were sold during the first week of release. The film was then released on DVD on May 20, 1997. This release was a double sided disc containing both widescreen (1.85:1) and full screen (1.33:1) versions of the film. Batman Forever made its Blu-ray debut on April 20, 2010. This was followed by an Ultra HD Blu-ray release on June 4, 2019.

Deleted scenes
Batman Forever went through a few major edits before its release. Originally darker than the final product, the film's original length was closer to 2 hours and 40 minutes, according to Schumacher. There was talk of an extended cut being released to DVD for the film's 10th anniversary in 2005. While all four previous Batman films were given special-edition DVD releases on the same day as the Batman Begins DVD release, none of them were given extended cuts, although some scenes were in a deleted scenes section in the special features.

Reception

Box office
Batman Forever opened in a record 2,842 theaters and 4,300 screens in the United States and Canada on June 16, 1995, grossing $52.8 million in its opening weekend, breaking Jurassic Parks record for highest opening-weekend gross of all time (it was surpassed two years later by The Lost World: Jurassic Parks $72.1 million). For six years, it had the largest opening weekend for a Warner Bros. film until 2001 when it was surpassed by Harry Potter and the Sorcerer's Stone. The film also achieved the highest June opening weekend, holding that record until it was beaten by Austin Powers: The Spy Who Shagged Me in 1999 and then Hulk four years later in 2003. It was the first film to gross $20 million in one day, on its opening day on Friday. It grossed $77.4 million in its first week which was below the record $81.7 million set by Jurassic Park.

Additionally, the film held the record for having the highest opening weekend for a superhero film until it was taken by X-Men in 2000. That year, How the Grinch Stole Christmas took Batman Forevers record for scoring the biggest opening weekend for any film starring Jim Carrey. While the film was overtaken by Pocahontas during its second weekend, it still made $29.2 million. It then became the first film of 1995 to reach $100 million domestically. The film started its international roll out in Japan on June 17, 1995, and grossed $2.2 million in 5 days from 167 screens, which was only 80% of the gross of its predecessor Batman Returns. 

The film went on to gross $184 million in the United States and Canada, and $152.5 million in other countries, totaling $336.53 million. The film grossed more than Batman Returns, and is the highest-grossing film from 1995 in the United States.

Critical response

On Rotten Tomatoes, Batman Forever has an approval rating of  based on  reviews. The site's critical consensus reads, "Loud, excessively busy, and often boring, Batman Forever nonetheless has the charisma of Jim Carrey and Tommy Lee Jones to offer mild relief." On Metacritic, the film has a score of 51 out of 100, based on 23 critics, indicating "mixed or average reviews". Audiences polled by CinemaScore gave the film an average grade of "A−" on an A+ to F scale.

Peter Travers of Rolling Stone wrote "Batman Forever still gets in its licks. There's no fun machine this summer that packs more surprises." Travers criticized the film's excessive commercialism and felt that "the script misses the pain Tim Burton caught in a man tormented by the long-ago murder of his parents", but praised Kilmer's performance as having a "deftly understated [...] comic edge". James Berardinelli of ReelViews enjoyed the film, writing "It's lighter, brighter, funnier, faster-paced, and a whole lot more colorful than before." On the television program Siskel & Ebert, Gene Siskel of the Chicago Tribune and Roger Ebert of the Chicago Sun-Times both gave the film mixed reviews, but with the former giving it a thumbs up and the latter a thumbs down. In his written review, Ebert wrote: "Is the movie better entertainment? Well, it's great bubblegum for the eyes. Younger children will be able to process it more easily; some kids were led bawling from Batman Returns where the PG-13 rating was a joke."

Mick LaSalle of the San Francisco Chronicle had a mixed reaction, concluding "a shot of Kilmer's rubber buns at one point is guaranteed to bring squeals from the audience." Brian Lowry of Variety believed "One does have to question the logic behind adding nipples to the hard-rubber batsuit. Whose idea was that supposed to be anyway, Alfred's? Some of the computer-generated Gotham cityscapes appear too obviously fake. Elliot Goldenthal's score, while serviceable, also isn't as stirring as Danny Elfman's work in the first two films."

Some observers thought Schumacher, a gay man, added possible homoerotic innuendo in the storyline. Regarding the costume design, Schumacher stated, "I had no idea that putting nipples on the Batsuit and Robin suit were going to spark international headlines. The bodies of the suits come from Ancient Greek statues, which display perfect bodies. They are anatomically correct." O'Donnell felt "it wasn't so much the nipples that bothered me. It was the codpiece. The press obviously played it up and made it a big deal, especially with Joel directing. I didn't think twice about the controversy, but going back and looking and seeing some of the pictures, it was very unusual."

Accolades

At the 68th Academy Awards, Batman Forever was nominated for Cinematography (lost to Braveheart), Sound (Donald O. Mitchell, Frank A. Montaño, Michael Herbick and Petur Hliddal; lost to Apollo 13) and Sound Effects Editing (John Leveque and Bruce Stambler) (also lost to Braveheart). "Hold Me, Thrill Me, Kiss Me, Kill Me" by U2 was nominated for the Golden Globe Award for Best Original Song (lost to "Colors of the Wind" from Pocahontas), but was also nominated for the Worst Original Song Golden Raspberry Award (lost to "Walk into the Wind" from Showgirls). At the Saturn Awards, the film was nominated for Best Fantasy Film (lost to Babe), Make-up (lost to Seven), Special Effects (lost to Jumanji) and Costume Design (lost to 12 Monkeys). Composer Elliot Goldenthal was given a Grammy Award nomination. Batman Forever received six nominations at the 1996 MTV Movie Awards, four of which were divided between two categories (Carrey and Lee Jones for Best Villain; and Seal's "Kiss from a Rose" and U2's "Hold Me" in Best Song from a Movie). However, it won in just one category—Best Song from a Movie for Seal's "Kiss from a Rose".

Legacy

#ReleaseTheSchumacherCut movement
Cuts were made to the film based on audience reactions during test screenings, like the rest of the Batman film franchise entries. Photographs from these scenes have always been available since the film's release, shown in magazines such as Starlog. In 2005, Batman Forever was the only film in the franchise to include a dedicated deleted scenes selection among its bonus content on the special edition DVD.

After Joel Schumacher died on June 22, 2020, media outlets started reporting the possible existence of an extended cut, with the first rumors being thrown in by American journalist Marc Bernardin. Bernardin claimed it to be darker and contain less camp than the theatrical cut. Some of the differences include Bruce having a vision of a human-sized bat, less of an emphasis on Dick Grayson, and a focus on Bruce's psychological issues with Chase. The cut uses about 50 minutes of additional footage. Warner Bros. confirmed that alternative test screening cuts existed after an interview with Variety, although they have no plans to release it and are unsure about what, if any, footage remains. Later on August 7, Kilmer's appearance at DC FanDome fueled fan speculation about the release of a so-called "Schumacher Cut". Batman Forever screenwriter Akiva Goldsman revealed in a YouTube interview in April 2021 that he had seen the original cut of the movie (dubbed "Preview Cut: One") recently and that he expects a rebirth for the movie coming up, suggesting all the footage needed to make the Schumacher cut still exists and that the release of a director's cut might be possible. Some of the aforementioned deleted scenes make up a portion of this footage.

Batman '89

An alternate six-issue comic book continuation of Batman Returns titled Batman '89, which ignores the events of Batman Forever and Batman & Robin and brings back Keaton's Batman along with Burton's dark setting seen in his first two Batman films, along with elements of his failed third Batman film (particularly, the return of Billy Dee Williams' Harvey Dent and transformation into Two-Face, the introductions of new versions of Robin and Barbara Gordon, and the return of Catwoman), was launched on August 10, 2021, with its issues releasing monthly before ending in January 2022.

In response to a question as to whether Schumacher's Batman films are canon to the world of Batman '89, the first two films' screenwriter Sam Hamm, who also serves as the comics' writer, confirmed that later two films take place in a diverging timeline and they are not building toward that fate.

Notes

References

External links

  (Warner Bros.)
  (DC Comics)
 
 
 

1995 films
1990s action films
1990s superhero films

Batman (1989 film series)

American action films

American sequel films
American superhero films

PolyGram Filmed Entertainment films
Warner Bros. films

American films about revenge
Casting controversies in film
Films produced by Tim Burton
Films directed by Joel Schumacher
Films set in psychiatric hospitals
Films about stalking
Films adapted into comics
Films shot in Los Angeles
Films shot in New York City
Films shot in Oregon
Films shot in San Francisco
Films with screenplays by Akiva Goldsman
Films scored by Elliot Goldenthal
Mad scientist films
Films produced by Peter MacGregor-Scott
1990s English-language films
1990s American films